Dysomma longirostrum is an eel in the family Synaphobranchidae (cutthroat eels). It was described by Chen Yu-Yun and Michael Hin-Kiu Mok in 2001. It is a marine, temperate water-dwelling eel which is known from Taiwan, in the northwestern Pacific Ocean. It dwells at a depth range of 100–150 metres. Males can reach a maximum total length of 19.6 centimetres.

The species epithet refers to the eel's long snout.

References

Synaphobranchidae
Fish described in 2001